4-Hydroxy-1-methyl-4-(4-methylphenyl)-3-piperidyl 4-methylphenyl ketone is a dopamine transporter reuptake inhibitor used as a lead compound to find a DRI transporter site antagonist (i.e. a compound that fills the ligand binding site without inhibiting the flow of neurotransmitters to the degree that another ligand at its site would).

In the Journal of Medical Chemistry, it was stated that "A novel, fairly potent dopamine transporter (DAT) inhibitor, 4-hydroxy-1-methyl-4-(4-methylphenyl)-3-piperidyl 4-methylphenyl ketone (3, K(i) values of 492 and 360 nM in binding affinity and inhibition of dopamine reuptake, respectively), with significant functional antagonism against cocaine and a different in vitro pharmacological profile from cocaine at the three transporter sites (dopamine, serotonin, and norepinephrine) was discovered through 3D-database pharmacophore searching. Through structure-activity relationships and molecular modeling studies, we found that hydrophobicity and conformational preference are two additional important parameters that determine affinity at the DAT site. Chemical modifications of the lead compound (3) led to a high affinity analogue (6, K(i) values of 11 and 55 nM in binding affinity and inhibition of dopamine reuptake, respectively). In behavioral pharmacological testing, 6 mimics partially the effect of cocaine in increasing locomotor activity in mice but lacks cocaine-like discriminative stimulus effect in rats. Taken together, these data suggest that 6 represents a promising lead for further evaluations as potential therapy for the treatment of cocaine abuse."

References 

Dopamine reuptake inhibitors